Ileana Mălăncioiu (born January 23, 1940) is a contemporary Romanian poet, essayist, journalist, dissident, and activist. She has been a corresponding member of the Romanian Academy since 2013.

Early life and education 
Mălăncioiu was born in 1940 in the village of Godeni, in the commune of the same name. Of her birth, she later said, "I was the second daughter born to my parents, and I was not received with much joy. They had expected a boy."

After graduating from the High School for Girls in Câmpulung in 1957, she originally trained as an accountant, then studied at the University of Bucharest's Faculty of Philosophy. She graduated in 1968 with a thesis on Lucian Blaga, then went on to obtain a doctor of philosophy from the university in 1977, writing her doctoral thesis on "Tragic Guilt (Greek Tragedies, Shakespeare, Dostoevsky, Kafka)."

Career 
Mălăncioiu began writing poetry, with her first published verse appearing in the magazine Luceafărul in 1965. She went on to publish over a dozen volumes of poetry, starting with Pasărea tăiată in 1967, and notably including Ardere de tot, Urcarea muntelui, Skärseldsberget, and the anthology Linia vieții. She is considered one of Romania's most important poets of the 1960s and '70s. Her work often centers on the trauma of history, while incorporating elements of Romanian rural life, folklore, religion, and literature. Mălăncioiu's poetry has been translated into English, including in the collections After the Raising of Lazarus (2005) and The Legend of the Walled-Up Wife (2012), both translated by Eiléan Ní Chuilleanáin.

Before 1989 and the Romanian Revolution, she also worked for the public TV station Televiziunea Română, the magazine Argeș, and the animation studio Animafilm. She faced censorship throughout the communist period, resigning from Viața Românească on March 31, 1988, due to tightening censorship, including of Noica's writing. Her 1985 poetry collection Urcarea muntelui ("The Climbing of the Mountain") was republished in 1992 to reincorporate censored material. She is well known for her post-1989 political commentary, forceful in her criticism of both Romanian's former leaders and those who succeeded them.

After 1989, she worked for the sociopolitical weekly Revista 22, as chief editor of the publishing house Litera, and for the literary magazine România Literară. She was awarded the Order of the Star of Romania, Commander rank, in 2000, for her artistic output and for her efforts to promote Romanian culture. In 2013, she was named as a corresponding member of the Romanian Academy.

Selected works

Poetry 
 Pasărea tăiată (The Slaughtered Fowl), Editura Tineretului, 1967
 Către Ieronim (Unto Hieronymus), Editura Albatros, 1970
 Inima reginei (The Queen's Heart), Editura Eminescu, 1971
 Poezii (Poems), Editura Cartea Românească, 1973
 Crini pentru domnișoara mireasă (Lilies for Her Ladyship the Bride), Editura Cartea Românească, 1973 (Romanian Academy Prize)
 Ardere de tot (Burnt Offering), Editura Cartea Românească, 1976
 Peste zona interzisă (Across the Forbidden Zone), Editura Cartea Românească, 1979 (Writers' Union of Romania Prize)
 Cele mai frumoase poezii (The Most Beautiful Poems), Editura Albatros, 1980
 Sora mea de dincolo (My Sister Beyond), Editura Cartea Românească, 1980
 Linia vieții (The Line of Life), Editura Cartea Românească, 1982 (Bucharest Writers Association Prize)
 Peste zona interzisă / A travers la zone interdite, Editura Eminescu, 1984 (French-Romanian bilingual anthology with a preface by )
 Urcarea muntelui (The Climbing of the Mountain), Editura Albatros, 1985 (Writers' Union of Romania Prize)
 Peste zona interzisă / Across the Forbidden Zone, Editura Eminescu, 1985 (Bilingual anthology with English translation by Dan Duțescu and with a preface by )
 Urcarea muntelui , Editura Litera, 1992 (2nd edition, uncensored and expanded)
 Ardere de tot (anthology), Editura Eminescu ("Poeți români contemporani" series), 1992 (published and unpublished works)
 Skärseldsberget, Hypatia, Stockholm, 1995 (Swedish translation)
 Poezii, Editura Vitruviu, București, 1996 (published and unpublished works)
 Linia vieții (anthology), Editura Polirom, 1999 (complete works and unpublished poems, with a preface by Nicolae Manolescu)

Essays and journalistic writing 
 Vina tragică, Tragicii Greci, Shakespeare, Dostoievski, Kafka, Editura Cartea Românească, 1978
 Călătorie spre mine însămi, Editura Cartea Românească, 1987
 Crimă și moralitate (political essays), Editura Litera, 1993
 Cronica melancoliei, Editura Enciclopedică, 1998 (Cluj Book Festival Prize)
 A vorbi într-un pustiu, Editura Polirom, 2002
 Recursul la memorie. Convorbiri cu Daniel Cristea-Enache, Editura Polirom, 2003
 Crimă și moralitate. Eseuri și publicistică, Editura Polirom, 2006
 Am reușit să rămîn eu însămi, Editura Polirom, 2016

References 

1940 births
People from Argeș County
Romanian women writers
Romanian women poets
Romanian women journalists
Romanian women essayists
Corresponding members of the Romanian Academy
Commanders of the Order of the Star of Romania
University of Bucharest alumni
Living people